Family Records is an independent record label, with a roster of indie rock, folk, and indie pop artists and bands, and is distributed by The Orchard. Besides releasing records by various artists, Family Records does artist management and artist development.

History

Family Records was originally formed in 2008 as a way for the Undisputed Heavyweights to release their debut album. Afterwards solo albums were released for band members Casey Shea and Jeff Jacobson, and soon after the label expanded to include many more artists.

Current (active) artists 

 Casey Shea
 Pearl and the Beard
 Wakey!Wakey!
 Lacrymosa
 U.S. Royalty

Record labels established in 2008